Neoferonia is a genus of beetles in the family Carabidae, containing the following species:

 Neoferonia ardua (Broun, 1893)
 Neoferonia edax (Chaudoir, 1878)
 Neoferonia fossalis (Broun, 1914)
 Neoferonia integrate (Bates, 1878)
 Neoferonia prasignis (Broun, 1903)
 Neoferonia procerula (Broun, 1886)
 Neoferonia prolixa (Broun, 1880)
 Neoferonia straneoi Britton, 1940
 Neoferonia truncatula (Broun, 1923)

References

Pterostichinae